The Islandpferde-Reiter- und Züchterverband e.V. (IPZV e.V.) is an organisation for the German riders and breeders of Icelandic horses and the association of all Icelandic horse-clubs of Germany.  The IPZV was founded in 1958 and is - with more than 25.000 members and about 70.000 registered horses in Germany - the biggest association of Icelandic horses worldwide. The IPZV is member of the International Icelandic horse Federation. (FEIF).

Sources
 Míček, Tomáš ; Schrenk, Hans-Jörg: Icelandic ponies, Milwaukee 1995 
 Rostock, Andrea-Katharina ; Feldmann, Walter: Islandpferde Reitlehre : Leitfaden für Haltung, Ausbildung und Reiten von Islandpferden und anderen Freizeitpferderassen; Bad Honnef 1988
 IPZV, Verabschiedete Satzung, gemäß IPZV-Mitgliederversammlung vom 12. März 2005; geändert durch die IPZV-Mitgliederversammlung vom 19. April 2008 pdf

External links 
 Official site of the Islandpferde-Reiter- und Züchterverband e.V. (IPZV e.V.)
 Official site of the International Icelandic horse Federation FEIF

Equestrian organizations
Clubs and societies in Germany
Organizations established in 1958
Bad Salzdetfurth
1958 establishments in West Germany